Tanner Hall (born October 26, 1983) is an American freeskier.

Biography

Hall, nicknamed 'Ski Boss', was born in Kalispell, Montana where he grew up skiing at Big Mountain, now named Whitefish Mountain Resort, starting at age three. He joined the freestyle ski team at age 10, skiing moguls and aerials until age 15 when he moved to Park City, Utah to pursue freeskiing. His first major competition was the US Open in Vail, Colorado

In 2002, Hall co-founded the freeride ski company Armada Skis with skier JP Auclair and photographer Chris O'Connell.  Hall is also part owner of the Retallack Snowcat Operation near Nelson, BC, Canada, along with skiers Seth Morrison and the young Algerian/Canadian Mehdi Trari.

In March 2005, while attempting a switch cork 900 over the legendary Chad's Gap in Wasatch backcountry, Utah, he pulled up short, hit the knuckle and then ragdolled down the landing, breaking both ankles.  His injuries put him out for the rest of the season but returned in 2006 to win gold at both the US Freeskiing Open and the Winter X-Games.

His attempt at a fourth gold in slopestyle was upset by Charles Gagnier and in 2009 he lost a fourth straight superpipe gold to Xavier Bertoni.

After overshooting a jump at Stevens Pass, in May 2009, in Washington, he went on hiatus for just over a year. He suffered from tibial plateau fractures and ACL tears in both knees. Hall returned to training on trampolines during summer 2010.

Hall embraces the Rasta culture and supports the marijuana lifestyle.  His DaKine line is called THC, which stand for the "Tanner Hall Collection" but is a play on the abbreviation for tetrahydrocannabinol, the psychoactive substance in cannabis. Hall is the co-founder of Inspired Media Concepts, a film and record company that focuses on rasta music and producing ski movies and webisodes.

After an 11-year relationship, Red Bull dropped their sponsorship of Tanner Hall at the Red Bull High Performance ski camp in New Zealand on August 29, 2012.

In February 2016, Hall became the first active professional athlete to create a pro model cannabis product and build a partnership with a cannabis company. Adventure travel brand Black Rock Originals created “The SKIBOSS Collection", a trio of products including rolling papers, a lighter and grinder; the three key item one needs to roll a joint.

Career achievements

1999

 1st – Jim Moran Benefit Slopestyle (day 2)
 2nd – Jim Moran Benefit Slopestyle (day 1)
 4th – US Open Slopestyle

2000

 1st – X Games Qualifier Big Air
 1st – X Games Big Air
 1st – US Open Big Air

2001

 1st – Red Bull Huckfest Big Air
 1st – X Games Qualifier Big Air
 1st – X Games-Big Air,
 2nd – Core Xtreme Games Big Air
 2nd – Core Xtreme Games QP
 3rd – US Freeskiing Open Slopestyle

2002

 1st – X Games Slopestyle
 1st – US Open Slopestyle
 1st – Red Bull Huckfest Big Air
 1st – Whistler Ski Invitational Big Air
 1st – Cham Jam Slopestyle
 1st – Ultimate Bumps & Jumps Half Pipe
 2nd – US Open Big Air
 2nd – Ultimate Bumps & Jumps Big Air
 2nd – Ultimate Bumps & Jumps Moguls

2003

 1st – X Games Slopestyle
 1st – US Open Slopestyle
 1st – Whistler Ski Invitational Big Air
 1st – Ultimate Bumps & Jumps Big Air
 1st – Park City All Stars Rail Jam
 1st – West Coast Invitational Rail Jam
 2nd – X Games Half Pipe
 2nd – US Open Big Air
 2nd – Whistler Ski Invitational Big Air
 2nd – Ultimate Bumps & Jumps Half Pipe
 2nd – Paul Mitchel Huck & Roll Half Pipe
 2nd – Paul Mitchell Huck & Roll Slopestyle

2004

 1st – X Games Slopestyle
 1st – BMW X3 FreeSki Invite
 1st – Whistler Ski Invitational Half Pipe
 1st – NorAm World Cup Half Pipe
 2nd – US Open Half Pipe
 2nd – World Superpipe Championships Half Pipe
 2nd – NorAm World Cup Half Pipe

2005

 1st – US Open Half Pipe
 2nd – X Games Half Pipe
 2nd – X Games Slopestyle
 2nd – US Open Slopestyle

2006

 1st – X Games Half Pipe
 1st – US Open Half Pipe

2007

 1st – X Games Half Pipe
 1st – US Open Half Pipe

2008

 1st – X Games Half Pipe
 1st – New Zealand Open Half Pipe

2009

 1st – Dew Tour Northstar Half Pipe
 1st – Dew Tour Breckenridge Half Pipe
 2nd – X Games Half Pipe
 3rd – Dew Tour Mt. Snow Half Pipe

2012

 1st – NZ Freeski Open Half Pipe.

Film appearances
Poor Boyz Productions
Twenty (2014)
 Everyday is a Saturday (2009)
 Reasons (2008)
 Propaganda (2001
 Session 12:42 (2003)
 Happy Dayz (2002)
 War (2005)
 13 (1999)
Inspired Media Concepts
 Ring The Alarm (2016)
 Let It Flow (2013)
 The Education Of Style (2012)
 Retallack: The Movie (2011)
Others
 MTV Scarred (2007)
 RE: Session (2009)
 The Massive (2008)
 Believe (2008)
 Burger Time
 Show & Prove
 WSKI 106
 The GAME
 The Front Nine
 High Society
 Yearbook
 Teddybear Crisis
 Strike Three
 The Realm
 Second Generation
 The Funkshow Diaries
 Further
 Scandalous
 Los Alamos 
 Area 51
 41 Degrees
 Balance
 Mind the Addiction
 Subject to Change
 David Lesh's "This Friday"

References

External links

Tanner Hall Moguls Preview on The Ski Channel
 Interview
 Armada
 Article on HookedOnWinter.com's WikiWinter
 Video clip of Tanner Hall's skiing accident

People from Kalispell, Montana
1983 births
Living people
American freeskiers
X Games athletes
American male freestyle skiers
Sportspeople from Montana